The 2017–18 East Carolina Pirates women's basketball team will represent East Carolina University during the 2017–18 NCAA Division I women's basketball season. The Pirates, led by eighth year head coach Heather Macy, play their home games at Williams Arena at Minges Coliseum and were fourth year members of the American Athletic Conference. They finished the season 16–15, 2–14 AAC play to finish in seventh place. They defeated SMU in the first round before losing in the quarterfinals of the American Athletic women's tournament to South Florida.

Media
All Pirates home games will have a video stream on Pirates All Access, ESPN3, or AAC Digital. Road games will typically be streamed on the opponents website, though conference road games could also appear on ESPN3 or AAC Digital. Audio broadcasts for most road games can also be found on the opponents website.

Roster

Schedule and results

|-
!colspan=9 style="background:#4F0076; color:#FFE600;"| Non-conference regular season

|-
!colspan=9 style="background:#4F0076; color:#FFE600;"| AAC regular season

|-
!colspan=12 style="background:#4B1869;"| AAC Women's Tournament

Rankings
2017–18 NCAA Division I women's basketball rankings

See also
2017–18 East Carolina Pirates men's basketball team

References

East Carolina
East Carolina Pirates women's basketball seasons